Heinrich Joseph Horwitz (28 April 1824 – 17 November 1899) was a German lawyer and liberal politician.

Biography 

Horwitz was born in Putzig, Kingdom of Prussia  (Puck, Poland), he was born to Jewish parents but later converted to Lutheranism. Horwitz started to study medicine at the  University of Berlin but switched to law at the University of Heidelberg, he began to practise as a lawyer in Bad Liebenwerda in 1858 and in Grünberg (Zielona Góra) in 1862. In 1867 Horwitz moved to Berlin, where he became a town councillor in 1870. In 1877 he was elected a member of the Prussian House of Representatives and a member of the Reichstag from 1883 to 1887 and from 1890 to 1893. He represented the National Liberal Party, the Liberal Union (Germany) and the German Free-minded Party.

Horwitz died in Berlin in 1899.

References

External links 
 portrait

1824 births
1899 deaths
People from Puck, Poland
People from the Province of Prussia
Heidelberg University alumni
Humboldt University of Berlin alumni
German Protestants
Converts to Lutheranism from Judaism
Liberal Union (Germany) politicians
National Liberal Party (Germany) politicians
German Free-minded Party politicians
Free-minded Union politicians
Members of the Prussian House of Representatives
Members of the 5th Reichstag of the German Empire
Members of the 6th Reichstag of the German Empire
Members of the 8th Reichstag of the German Empire
19th-century Lutherans